

2020

Non-circulating coins

Circulating coins

Medals

2021

Non-circulating coins

Circulating coins

2022

Non-circulating coins

Circulating coins

Medals

References

Commemorative coins of the United States